The inner enamel epithelium, also known as the internal enamel epithelium, is a layer of columnar cells located on the rim nearest the dental papilla of the enamel organ in a developing tooth.  This layer is first seen during the cap stage, in which these inner enamel epithelium cells are pre-ameloblast cells. These will differentiate into Ameloblasts which are responsible for secretion of enamel during tooth development.

The location of the enamel organ where the outer and inner enamel epithelium join is called the cervical loop.

References
Cate, A.R. Ten. Oral Histology: development, structure, and function. 5th ed. 1998. .
Ross, Michael H., Gordon I. Kaye, and Wojciech Pawlina. Histology: a text and atlas. 4th edition. 2003. .

Tooth development